The  is an incomplete two-lane national expressway in Tokachi Subprefecture, Hokkaido. It is owned and operated primarily by the Ministry of Land, Infrastructure, Transport and Tourism (MLIT), but has a short section maintained and tolled by the East Nippon Expressway Company at its northern terminus with the Dōtō Expressway. The route is signed as an auxiliary route of National Route 236 as well E60 under MLIT's  "2016 Proposal for Realization of Expressway Numbering."

Route description
The speed limit is 100 km/h for the entire route. There is only one lane travelling in each direction along the entirety of the expressway.

History
The first section of the Obihiro-Hiroo Expressway opened on 15 March 2003 between the Dōtō Expressway and Hokkaido Route 1153 in Obihiro. The next addition opened three years later, extending the expressway  to Hokkaido Route 1157 (Obihiro Airport Road). In 2008 the route was extended to Nakasatsunai. After five years, the next section to Sarabetsu was added. As of February 2019, the most recent addition was completed in 2015, extending the route to its current southern terminus at Chūrui-Taiki Interchange.

Future

Junction list
The entire expressway is in Hokkaido.

See also

Japan National Route 236
Dōtō Expressway

References

External links

 Ministry of Land, Infrastructure and Transport: Hokkaido Development Bureau

Expressways in Japan
Roads in Hokkaido